John McDougall may refer to:

Politics

Canada
 John Lorn McDougall Sr. (1800–1860), businessman and politician, member of the Legislative Assembly of the Province of Canada
 John McDougall (Quebec politician) (1805–1870), member of the Legislative Assembly of the Province of Canada from Canada East
 John Lorn McDougall (1838–1909), member of the Canadian House of Commons and the Legislative Assembly of Ontario
 John Chantler McDougall (1842–1917), missionary and politician, member of the Legislative Assembly of Alberta
 John McDougall (Ontario politician), member of the Legislative Assembly of Ontario, 1875–1879
 John Alexander McDougall (1854–1928),  mayor of Edmonton and member of the Legislative Assembly of Alberta

Elsewhere
 John Frederick McDougall (1820–1896), Australian politician and pastoralist, member of the Queensland Legislative Council
 Sir John McDougall (British politician) (1844–1917), chairman of the London County Council
 John E. McDougall (1860–1932), American politician, Lieutenant Governor of South Dakota
 John Keith McDougall (1867–1957), Australian politician, member of Parliament for Wannon, Victoria

Sports
 John McDougall (footballer, born 1853) (1853–1925), Scotland international footballer, 1877–1879
 John McDougall (cricketer) (1886–1971), Scottish cricketer
 John McDougall (footballer, born 1900) (1900–?), Scottish footballer of the 1920s

Other
 John Alexander McDougall (artist) (1810–1894), American portrait painter
 John McDougall (VC) (1839–1869), British recipient of the Victoria Cross
 John McDougall (phthisiologist) (1890–1967), Scottish doctor and international rugby player, 1913–1921
 John R. McDougall (born 1945), Canadian petroleum engineer, great-grandson of John Alexander McDougall
 John A. McDougall (born 1947), American physician, nutrition expert, and author
 John McDougall (mechanical engineer), British mechanical engineer

See also
 John McDougal (1818–1866), American politician, second Governor of California
 Jock McDougall (1901–1973), Scottish footballer
 John MacDougall (disambiguation)